William M. Connell School is a historic school located at 650 Plymouth Avenue in Fall River, Massachusetts. It was built in 1893 and added to the National Register of Historic Places in 1983. It was designed by notable city architect Joseph M. Darling on the same plan as the Davol School. The school is named after William Connell, who served as the city's Superintendent of Schools from 1872 to 1894.

The Connell School was one of about a dozen elementary schools closed in June 2008 by the city, with the opening of several new, larger buildings.

See also
National Register of Historic Places listings in Fall River, Massachusetts

References

School buildings on the National Register of Historic Places in Massachusetts
Buildings and structures in Fall River, Massachusetts
Schools in Bristol County, Massachusetts
School buildings completed in 1893
National Register of Historic Places in Fall River, Massachusetts